Brodmann area 26 is the name for a small part of the brain.

Human
In the human this area is called ectosplenial area 26. It is a cytoarchitecturally defined portion of the retrosplenial region of the cerebral cortex. It is a narrow band located in the isthmus of cingulate gyrus adjacent to the fasciolar gyrus internally. It is bounded externally by the granular retrolimbic area 29 (Brodmann-1909).

Guenon
In the guenon Brodmann area 26 is a subdivision of the cerebral cortex defined on the basis of cytoarchitecture. The smallest of Brodmann's cortical areas in the monkey, it represents cortex that is less differentiated and smaller in monkey and human than in other species. Brodmann regarded it as topographically and cytoarchitecturally homologous to the combined human ectosplenial area 26, granular retrolimbic area 29 and agranular retrolimbic area 30 (Brodmann-1909). Distinctive features (Brodmann-1905): thin cortex; distinct but narrow layers.

See also

 Brodmann area
 List of regions in the human brain

External links
 BrainInfo, with information about the neuroanatomy of Brodmann area 26

26
Medial surface of cerebral hemisphere